The Last Tinker: City of Colors is an action-adventure game developed by Mimimi Productions for Microsoft Windows, OS X and Linux which was released on 12 May 2014. The PlayStation 4 version was handled by Loot Interactive, and released digitally on the PlayStation Store on August 19, 2014, in North America and August 20, 2014, in Europe and Australia. A retail version published by Dutch publisher Soedesco was released in May 2015 in Europe and in March 2016 in North America.

An Xbox One port of the game was planned, but was cancelled due to poor sales on the PlayStation 4 version.

Reception
The Last Tinker: City of Colors received mixed reviews and the German Video Game Award 2015 for best game design. Aggregating review websites GameRankings and Metacritic gave the Microsoft Windows version 75.63% based on 27 reviews and 72/100 based on 41 reviews and the PlayStation 4 version 67.25% based on 20 reviews and 66/100 based on 19 reviews.

References

2014 video games
Action-adventure games
Cancelled Xbox One games
Indie video games
Linux games
MacOS games
PlayStation 4 games
PlayStation Network games
Single-player video games
Video games developed in Germany
Windows games
Soedesco games